There have been two baronetcies created for members of the Coote family. The first is Coote of Castle Cuffe, while the second is Coote of Donnybrooke, both in the Baronetage of Ireland. As of 2020, the first creation is still extant. The holders of the first creation also held the title of Earl of Mountrath between 1660 and 1802.

History

Baronetcy of 1621
The Coote Baronetcy, of Castle Cuffe in the Queen's County, was created in the Baronetage of Ireland on 2 April 1621 for Charles Coote. who had moved to Ireland as a soldier and become an administrator. He was succeeded by his eldest son, Charles, the second Baronet, who was raised to the Peerage of Ireland as Baron Coote, of Castle Cuffe in the Queen's County, Viscount Coote, of Castle Coote in the County of Roscommon, and Earl of Mountrath, in the Queen's County, on 6 September 1660. The titles descended from father to son until the death of the first Earl's great-grandson, Charles, the fourth Earl, in 1715. The latter's two brothers, Henry, the fifth Earl, and Algernon, the sixth Earl, both succeeded in the titles. The sixth Earl was succeeded by his son, Charles, the seventh Earl. In 1800, Charles was created Baron Castle Coote, in the County of Roscommon, in the Peerage of Ireland, with remainder to his kinsman and namesake Charles Coote.

The earldom, viscountcy and barony of Coote became extinct on the seventh Earl's death in 1802, as he left no legitimate male issue, while he was succeeded in the barony of Castle Coote (according to the special remainder) by the aforementioned Charles Coote, the second Baron (see Baron Castle Coote for further history of this title).

The Coote baronetcy was passed on to the late Earl's kinsman, Charles Henry Coote, who became the ninth Baronet. The latter was the great-great-great-grandson of Chidley Coote (died 1668), younger son of Sir Charles Coote, 1st Baronet, and younger brother of the first Earl of Mountrath (the ninth Baronet was also the first cousin once removed of the second Baron Castle Coote). Two of the ninth Baronet's sons, Charles, the tenth Baronet, and Algernon, the eleventh Baronet, who was Sheriff of Queen's County in 1897, succeeded in the title. The title is now held by Algernon's great-great-great-grandson, the sixteenth Baronet, with the baronetcy having descended from father to son.

The family seat was Ballyfin House, near Mountrath, County Laois.

Baronetcy of 1774
The Coote Baronetcy, of Donnybrooke in the County of Dublin, was created in the Baronetage of Ireland on 18 May 1774 for Charles Coote, 1st Earl of Bellomont, with remainder to his illegitimate son Charles Coote. Lord Bellomont was the great-grandson of Richard Coote, 1st Baron Coote, younger son of Sir Charles Coote, 1st Baronet, of Castle Cuffe (see above and also Earl of Bellomont for earlier history of this branch of the Coote family). On his death in 1800 the earldom and barony of Coote became extinct while he was succeeded in the baronetcy according to the special remainder by his illegitimate son, the aforementioned Charles, the second Baronet. The baronetcy became extinct on the death of the second Baronet's grandson, Charles, the fourth Baronet, in 1920 (the title having descended from father to son).

Several other members of the Coote family may also be mentioned. Sir Eyre Coote, great-uncle of the ninth Baronet, was a soldier. Robert Coote, younger son of the ninth Baronet, was an admiral in the Royal Navy. His son Stanley Victor Coote (1862–1925) was High Sheriff of Roscommon in 1900. John Oldham Coote (1921–1993), grandson of Cecil Henry Coote, younger son of the eleventh Baronet, was a captain in the Royal Navy. The Right Reverend Roderic Coote, son of Commander Bernard Trotter Coote, younger son of the twelfth Baronet, was Bishop of Gambia and the Rio Pongas, Bishop of Fulham, and finally of Colchester.

Coote baronets, of Castle Cuffe (1621)
Sir Charles Coote, 1st Baronet (died 1642)
Sir Charles Coote, 2nd Baronet (c. 1610–1661) (created Earl of Mountrath in 1660)

Earls of Mountrath (1660)

Charles Coote, 1st Earl of Mountrath (–1661)
Charles Coote, 2nd Earl of Mountrath (c. 1630–1672)
Charles Coote, 3rd Earl of Mountrath (c. 1655–1709)
Charles Coote, 4th Earl of Mountrath (c. 1680–1715)
Henry Coote, 5th Earl of Mountrath (1684–1720)
Algernon Coote, 6th Earl of Mountrath (1689–1744)
Charles Henry Coote, 7th Earl of Mountrath (1725–1802) (created Baron Castle Coote in 1800)

Coote baronets, of Castle Cuffe (1621; Reverted)

Sir Charles Henry Coote, 9th Baronet (1792–1864) 
Sir Charles Henry Coote, 10th Baronet (1815–1895)
Sir Algernon Coote, 11th Baronet (1817–1899) (Sheriff of Queen's County in 1897)
Sir Algernon Charles Plumptre Coote, 12th Baronet (1847–1920)
Sir Ralph Algernon Coote, 13th Baronet (1874–1941) 
Sir John Ralph Coote, 14th Baronet (1905–1978)
Sir Christopher John Coote, 15th Baronet (1928–2016)
Sir Nicholas Patrick Coote, 16th Baronet (born 1953)

The heir apparent is the present holder's only son, Rory Alasdair Coote (born 1987).

Coote baronets, of Donnybrooke (1774)
Charles Coote, 1st Earl of Bellomont, 1st Baronet (1738–1800)
Sir Charles Coote, 2nd Baronet (1765–1857)
Sir Charles Coote, 3rd Baronet (1798–1861)
Sir Charles Algernon Coote, 4th Baronet (1847–1920)

See also
Earl of Bellomont
Baron Castle Coote
Ballyfin Demesne

References

Baronetcies in the Baronetage of Ireland
Extinct baronetcies in the Baronetage of Ireland
Baronetcies created with special remainders
1621 establishments in Ireland
Coote family